Synaptotagmin-4 is a protein that in humans is encoded by the SYT4 gene.

References

Further reading

External links